Louis J. Marchetti (1920–1992), known as Lou Marchetti, was an American free-lance illustrator and fine artist. He was best known for his paperback book covers.

Biography
He was born in Fondi, Italy and immigrated to the United States at an early age. He attended Bryant High School on Long Island, New York and later studied for five years at the Art Students League of New York with two scholarships.

As an editorial illustrator, he created numerous book covers and illustrations, primarily for Dell Books, Pocket Books, Lancer Books, Paperback Library, and Popular Library. His creative work extended into posters for the motion picture industry, promotional illustrations for television (I Spy NBC), magazine illustration True (magazine), Galaxy, and Reader's Digest, as well as a series of religious collector's plates offered by the Danbury Mint.

His fine art appeared in several galleries across the United States, including the Grand Central Art Galleries (New York).  Marchetti's fine art often reflected the Lazio provincial Italian countryside near his place of birth.

He was a member of the Society of Illustrators.

Personal life
He had a daughter named Louise Marchetti Zeitlin.

References

External links
 Official website

American illustrators
American people of Italian descent
Italian artists
Italian illustrators
Portrait artists
Italian poster artists
1920 births
1992 deaths